The Risco Waterfall ("Risco" meaning risk in English) is a group of waterfalls located in Rabaçal, Paul da Serra, in the Madeira Islands.

The waterfall is 100m high, consisting of a group of different water streams coming vertically down the mountainside. At its foot there are rocks covered in small plants and a small natural pool.

See also
List of waterfalls
Geography of Portugal

References

Waterfalls of Madeira
Geography of Madeira